F36 or F.XXXVI may refer to :
 Fokker F.XXXVI, a 1934 Dutch four-engined 32-passenger airliner 
 Hirth F-36, an aircraft engine
 HMS Nubian (F36), a 1937 British Royal Navy Tribal-class destroyer
 HMS Whitby (F36), a British Royal Navy Whitby-class anti-submarine frigate